The Hutchins State Jail (TDCJ code: HJ) is a state prison for men located in Hutchins, a city in Dallas County, Texas, with a Dallas postal address. It is a part of the Texas Department of Criminal Justice. The state jail serves mixed security levels, with an official capacity of 2276.

History
On July 22, 2011, an inmate collapsed and died after only three days in the facility.  His death was attributed to the hot environment of the prison; his body temperature was over 109°F when admitted to the hospital.  His family filed a wrongful-death suit against the state, citing nine examples of Texas state inmates dying of heat-related causes in 2011 alone. Larry McCollum, the individual who died, had a 12-month sentence for check fraud. Hutchins Unit still has no air conditioning in the 9 standard housing units.

References

Prisons in Texas
Buildings and structures in Dallas County, Texas
1995 establishments in Texas